Fannie Eliza Ostrander (1859 – 1921) was an American writer.

Born in North Haven, Connecticut, Ostrander was a graduate of the Wisconsin State Normal School; she also had private instruction. She taught school for four and a half years, and became a critic, editor, and writer for a publishing house in Chicago in 1899. She wrote a series of magazine articles titled "New Lines of Thought", and wrote both prose and verse for a number of magazines. She wrote a number of novels and books for children as well. Later in life she lived in New Haven, Connecticut.

Partial works list
When Hearts are True, 1897
Beautiful Bible Stories, 1899
Baby Goose, His Adventures, 1900
Frolics of the A.B.C., 1901
The Gift of the Magic Staff, 1902
Animals At the Zoo, [1902]
Little Pixies Abroad, 1905
Goose Family Tales, 1905
Little White Indians, 1907
The Boy Who Won

– derived from

References

1859 births
1921 deaths
American magazine journalists
American women journalists
American women novelists
American children's writers
19th-century American journalists
19th-century American novelists
19th-century American women writers
20th-century American journalists
20th-century American novelists
20th-century American women writers
American women children's writers
University of Wisconsin–Milwaukee alumni
People from North Haven, Connecticut
Novelists from Connecticut
Journalists from Connecticut